The 1979 Virginia Senate elections were held on November 6, 1979, alongside the Virginia House of Delegates election. All 40 seats in the Senate of Virginia were up for election.

Overall results

See also 
 United States elections, 1979
 Virginia elections, 1979
 Virginia House of Delegates election, 1979

References

Virginia
1979 Virginia elections
Virginia Senate elections